The Fabulous 8-Track Sound of Superdrag is a seven-song EP from Superdrag released by Darla Records in 1995.  This EP—Superdrag's first—demonstrated many of the stylistic traits typical of the band throughout its existence, including heavily distorted and often simple guitar work, bass guitar lines which convey the instrumental melody (as in "Really Thru" and "Load"), long periods where one or more instruments are either largely idle or absent ("Bloody Hell" and "Load"), and extensive use of vocal harmonies ("Sugar", "Really Thru", and "Load").

Track listing
All songs written by John Davis.
"Sugar"
"Bloody Hell"
"Really Thru"
"Liquor"
"6/8"
"Blown Away"
"Load"

Personnel
 John Davis – vocals, guitar
 Don Coffey Jr. – drums
 Brandon Fisher – guitar
 Tom Pappas – bass

References

Superdrag albums
1995 debut EPs
Albums produced by Nick Raskulinecz